André Campaes (born Lourdes, 30 March 1944) is a former French rugby union player. He played as a wing.

Campaes played all his career at FC Lourdes, where he won the French Championship in 1967/68, and the Challenge Yves du Manoir, in 1966 and 1967.

He had 14 caps for France, from 1965 to 1973, scoring 4 tries, 12 points on aggregate. He played in three Five Nations Championship competitions, in 1965, 1968 and 1969. He was a member of the winning side at the 1968 Five Nations Championship, with a Grand Slam. He was also one of the two top try scorers, with two tries.

References

External links
André Campaes at ESPN

1944 births
Living people
French rugby union players
France international rugby union players
FC Lourdes players
People from Lourdes
Rugby union wings
Sportspeople from Hautes-Pyrénées